Sterchi is a surname. Notable people with the surname include:

Beat Sterchi (born 1949), Swiss author
James G. Sterchi (1867–1932), American businessman